The Hong Kong Schools Sports Federation (HKSSF) is a non-profit schools sports organisation based in Hong Kong. Formed in 1 September 1997, it is the sports governing body of different major school sports events, organising local secondary and primary schools inter-school, inter-area competitions. As well as other "Jing-ying" (elite), inter-port, overseas and international school sports competitions.

The organisation also established and owned the Hong Kong Schools Sports Federation football team, which is formed by students from Hong Kong secondary schools.

From 2015 to 2018, Hong Kong Schools Sports Federation organised the "Nike All Hong Kong Schools Jing Ying Basketball Tournament".

Events organised

Primary schools 

 Athletics
 Badminton
 Basketball
 Fencing
 Football
 5-a-side football
 5-a-side handball
 Games
 Gymnastics
 Squash
 Swimming
 Table tennis
 Tennis
 Volleyball

Secondary schools 

 Archery
 Athletics
 Badminton
 Basketball
 Beach volleyball
 Cross-country
 Fencing
 Football
 Girls football
 Gymnastics
 Handball
 Hockey
 Indoor rowing
 Life saving
 Netball
 Rugby
 Rugby sevens
 Softball
 Squash
 Swimming
 Table Tennis
 Tennis
 Ten-pin Bowling
 Volleyball
The HKSSF organises major sports events such as the Hong Kong Inter-School Athletics Competition, a competition that aims to explore young talents in track and field events, performing selection for Hong Kong representation at interport, Asian and World Competition.

External links 
 Official website
 2015-16 Nike All Hong Kong Schools Jing Ying Basketball Tournament
 2017-18 Nike All Hong Kong Schools Jing Ying Basketball Tournament

References 

Sports governing bodies in Hong Kong
High school sports